Petalodontidae is an extinct family of marine cartilaginous fish related to the modern-day Chimaera, found in what is now the United States of America and Europe. With a very few exceptions, they are known entirely from teeth.  All fossils range from the Carboniferous to the Permian, where they are presumed to have died out during the Permian/Triassic extinction event.

References

External links 

 Petalodontidae at merriam-webster.com
 Petalodontidae at biolib.cz

Petalodontiformes
Carboniferous cartilaginous fish
Permian cartilaginous fish
Permian extinctions
Prehistoric cartilaginous fish families
Mississippian first appearances